The International Earth Science Olympiad (IESO), one of the thirteen International Science Olympiads, is an annual competition for secondary school students that tests their abilities in disciplines such as geology, meteorology, environmental science, and terrestrial astronomy. Students who are winners of the respective national competitions are invited to participate in the IESO, and all interested countries are encouraged to contribute to the IESO. The IESO is one of the only three International Science Olympiads (along with the International Linguistics Olympiad and International Olympiad on Astronomy and Astrophysics) to include an International Team Competition.

It is one of the major activities of the International Geoscience Education Organization that aims at raising student interest in and public awareness of Earth sciences, as well as to enhance Earth science learning of students.

History 
The IESO was first suggested and started by Korean earth scientists. In 2003, the Korean Earth Science Society (KESS) organized the inaugural Korean Earth Science Olympiad. The international competition was adopted as one of the major activities of the International Geoscience Education Organization (IGEO) later that year.

In November 2004 in Seoul, representatives from ten countries gathered to discuss the curriculum and the format of IESO. 23 presentations were made and the IESO Advisory Committee was established with members including Chairperson Moo Young Song, Hendra Amijaya, Roberto Greco, Ken-ichiro Hisada, Thomas Lorillard Tailer, Chang Chun-Yen, Miguel Cano, Shankar Rajasekharaiah, and Chan-Jong Kim. The IESO Syllabus Commission was then developed in 2005, and the first International competition was held in 2007.

The first IESO was held in October 2007 in Daegu, South Korea, where the Chinese Taipei team won first place with three gold medals and one silver medal. The Korean team placed second with one gold and three silver medals, the United States followed in third with two silver and two bronze medals, and India was placed fourth with two silver medals.

The second IESO (2008) took place in Manila, Philippines, with the theme "Cooptition in Addressing Climate Change" (the word "cooptition" refers to a combination of competition and cooperation). Its aim was to promote global Earth science education and international cooperation in mitigating anthropogenic harm to the environment.

The third IESO took place in Taipei, in September 2009 with the theme "Human Environment". Fourth IESO took place in Yogyakarta, Indonesia in September 2010 with the theme "The Present is the key to the Future".

In 2010 in Indonesia, the International Team Competition focus on sustainability and the use of underground water. The 2013 IESO was performed in Mysore, India, and in 2014, in Santander, Spain. The 2015 IESO took place in Poços de Caldas, Minas Gerais, Brazil. 31 countries participated in IESO 2016. In 2017, the International Earth Science Olympiad was hosted by France.

The 2018 IESO was hosted by Thailand on the Mahidol University campuses. The United States won first place in both the 2018 and 2019 IESO. In 2018, the United States won four gold medals, the first time the United States had won any gold medals in its history of competing in the IESO. In 2019, the United States won two gold and two silver medals.

The 2020 IESO was canceled due to the COVID-19 pandemic. In 2021, the IESO was entirely virtual with a modified format. Each country was allowed a team of eight students who may compete in one or more activities. The IESO consisted of six activities: the Data Mining Test, the National Team Field Investigation (NTFI), the Earth Systems Project (ESP), Mission to Mars, the Earth Systems Pledge, and IESO Art and Science. Competitive activities were graded as Excellent, Very Good, or Good.

Selection Process 

Selection processes for teams represented at the IESO varies from country to country. Countries like China and Australia administer exams that progressively increase in difficulty for the purposes of team selection. In the United States, students are chosen by the United States Earth Science Organization (USESO) after a series of exams administered at a summer camp designed for team selection and preparation. The USESO program also features mock team events and field practicals in preparation for similar events at the IESO.

Summary

References 

 "Korean Team Ranks 2nd in Earth Science Olympiad"
 "IESO Statutes"

External links 
 

International Science Olympiad